The 2007 BMC election was held on 16 February 2007.

Election result 

Shiv Sena - BJP alliance won the BMC election thrice in a row 1997, 2002 and 2007. Shiv Sena,  Bhartiya Janta Party and Indian National Congress are the major political parties in this election.

See also 
 2007 Maharashtra Municipal Corporation Elections

References 

Mumbai
Brihanmumbai Municipal Corporation
2007 elections in India